Florencio Cornelia (born 14 June 1981 in Leiderdorp) is a Dutch footballer who played professionally for Eerste Divisie clubs Go Ahead Eagles, Stormvogels Telstar and Fortuna Sittard during the 2000-2008 football seasons.

Club career
Cornelia constantly switched between professional and amateur football, playing for the likes of Noordwijk, Ter Leede and Rijnvogels in between spells in the Eerste Divisie.

In 2011 he left Topklasse outfit Genemuiden after  years at the club and joined Young Boys. He later returned to Noordwijk and then Ter Leede.

References

1981 births
Living people
People from Leiderdorp
Dutch people of Curaçao descent
Association football forwards
Dutch footballers
Go Ahead Eagles players
SC Telstar players
Fortuna Sittard players
Eerste Divisie players
Ter Leede players
SC Genemuiden players
Footballers from South Holland